The 2017 IFCPF CP Football World Championships was the world championship for men's national 7-a-side association football teams. IFCPF stands for International Federation of Cerebral Palsy Football. Athletes competed with a physical disability. The Championship took place in the Argentina from 4 to 24 September 2017.

Football CP Football was played with modified FIFA rules. Among the modifications there were seven players, no offside, a smaller playing field, and permission for one-handed throw-ins. Matches consisted of two thirty-minute halves, with a fifteen-minute half-time break. The Championships was a qualifying event for the 2019 IFCPF CP Football World Championships.

Participating teams and officials

Qualifying
The following teams were qualified for the tournament:

1 Scotland would be qualified as a second-placed team by the qualifying tournament for the World Cup. But they had to withdraw their participation. Thus, the nine-place team of the qualifying team, Spain, took part and took part in the world championship.

The draw
During the draw, the teams were divided into pots because of rankings. Here, the following groups:

Squads

Group A

Group B

Group C

Group D

Venues
The venues to be used for the World Championships were located in San Luis.

Format

The first round, or group stage, was a competition between the 16 teams divided among four groups of four, where each group engaged in a round-robin tournament within itself. The two highest ranked teams in each group advanced to the knockout stage for the position one to sixteen. the two lower ranked teams played for the positions 17 to 32. The teams were awarded three points for a win and one for a draw. When comparing teams in a group over-all result came before head-to-head.

In the knockout stage there were three rounds (quarter-finals, semi-finals, and the final). The winners plays for the higher positions, the losers for the lower positions. For any match in the knockout stage, a draw after 60 minutes of regulation time was followed by two 10 minute periods of extra time to determine a winner. If the teams were still tied, a penalty shoot-out was held to determine a winner.

Classification
Athletes with a physical disability competed. The athlete's disability was caused by a non-progressive brain damage that affects motor control, such as cerebral palsy, traumatic brain injury or stroke. Athletes must be ambulant.

Players were classified by level of disability.
C5: Athletes with difficulties when walking and running, but not in standing or when kicking the ball.
C6: Athletes with control and co-ordination problems of their upper limbs, especially when running.
C7: Athletes with hemiplegia.
C8: Athletes with minimal disability; must meet eligibility criteria and have an impairment that has impact on the sport of football.

Teams must field at least one class C5 or C6 player at all times. No more than two players of class C8 are permitted to play at the same time.

Group stage
The first round, or group stage, have seen the sixteen teams divided into four groups of four teams.

Group A

Group B

Group C

Group D

Knockout stage

Quarter-finals
Position 9-16

Position 1-8

Semi-finals
Position 13-16

Position 9-12

Position 5-8

Position 1-4

Finals
Position 15-16

Position 13-14

Position 11-12

Position 9-10

Position 7-8

Position 5-6

Position 3-4

Final

Statistics

Goalscorers
10 goals
  Dillon Sheridan

8 goals
  Dmitrii Pestretsov
  Hossein Tiz Bor

6 goals
  Samuel Charron
  David Porcher

5 goals

  Volodymyr Antoniuk
  Adam Ballou
  Kevin Damian Bonomi
  Cameron DeLillo
  George Fletcher
  Mariano Morana

4 goals

  James Victor Ackinclose
  Aleksei Borkin
  Mehdi Jamali
  Viacheslav Larionov
  Ubirajara Magalhães
  Gary Messett
  Vitaliy Romanchuk

3 goals

  Ryan Walker
  Wanderson Silva de Oliveira
  Juan Andrés Acevedo
  Michael Barker
  Adriano Costa Martins
  Eduardo Felipe da Silva Martins
  Taras Dutko
  Zachary Jones
  Artem Krasylnykov
  Oliver Nugent
  Rik Rodenburg
  Aaron Tier

2 goals

  Ben Atkins
  Evandro Oliveira Gomes De Oliveira
  Mariano Cortes
  Matthew Anthony Crossen
  Marat Eloev
  Kevin Hensley
  Seth Jahn
  Aleksandr Kuligin
  Wesley Martins
  Ehsan Masoumzadeh
  Leonardo Giovani Moraes
  Asbrubal Olivares Mora
  Stanislav Podolskyi
  Jose Quintana
  Jack Rutter
  Jeroen Schuitert
  Artem Sheremet
  Ivan Shkvarlo
  Dale Smith
  Liam Stanley
  Lewis Martin Tribe
  Tatsuhiro Ura
  Yari Villegas

1 goal

  Jasem Bakhshi
  David Barber
  James Blackwell
  Andrew Marten Bremer
  Carlos Carrizo
  Duncan Coronel
  Jan da Costa
  Malik Madiba de la Cruz Victoria
  Amirreza Ezzatdoust Sehsari
  Matiaz Fernadez
  Maximiliano Fernandez
  Claudio Figuera
  David Garza
  Jose Manuel Gomez Suarez
  Edhar Kahramanian
  Luís Miguel Leal Ferreira
  David Leavy
  Oleh Len
  Rodrigo Lugrin
  Adriano Costa Martins
  Nicholas Mayhugh
  Duncan McDonald
  Dmitry Minenko
  Dmytro Molodtsov
  Zaurbek Pagaev
  Mario Fernandez Pardo
  Lucas Pinheiro
  Nicholas Prescott
  Rui Diogo Ribeiro Gonçalves
  Ben Roche
  Santiago Macia Rovira
  Jeroen Saedt
  Amirreza Ezzatdoust Sehsari
  Aleksey Tumakov
  Jordan Walker

own goals
 2 x  Ben Atkins
 2 x  Tomohisa Ono

Ranking

See also

References

External links
Official website

2017 IFCPF World Championships Logo
2017 IFCPF CP Football World Championships from the website ifcpf.com
Ranking from the website ifcpf.com
Cerebral Palsy International Sports & Recreation Association (CPISRA)
International Federation of Cerebral Palsy Football (IFCPF)

CP football
2017 in association football
2017
2017–18 in Argentine football
Paralympic association football
September 2017 sports events in South America